Shimon Sharif (born 7 February 1978) is an Indian sport shooter. He started his sports career in 1995. He has participated in several international shooting competitions including the ISSF World Cup in Korea in 2003. In 2007, he became the first Indian to compete in the Running Target event. He is named in the "Limca Book of Records" for floating India’s first website on shooting sports indianshooting.com. He conceptualized Online Shooting during pandemic Covid-19 and has so far organized multiple editions of International Online Shooting Championship and a month-long Online Shooting League which also became the World's first online league in an Olympic sport. Shimon is also the founder of Topgun Shooting Academy.

Awards and recognition
 Limca Book of Records for launching India's first ever website on shooting sport back in 2005.

External links
 http://www.indianshooting.com
Shimon Sharif's profile at ISSF

References

1978 births
Living people
ISSF rifle shooters
Indian male sport shooters